Dipak Kalra (born 18 July 1959, London, UK) is President of the European Institute for Health Records and of the European Institute for Innovation through Health Data. He undertakes international research and standards development, and advises on adoption strategies, relating to Electronic Health Records.

Education

Dipak Kalra studied medicine at Guy's Hospital in London, and specialized in General Practice. He is a Fellow of the Royal College of General Practitioners. He worked as a London GP for a decade before specializing in Health Informatics. He obtained a PhD in Health Informatics in 2003 and is a Fellow of the British Computer Society.

Career
Kalra plays a leading international role in research and development of Electronic Health Record architectures and systems, including the requirements and models needed to ensure the robust long-term preservation of clinical meaning and protection of privacy. He leads the development of CEN (European Committee for Standardization) and ISO (International Organization for Standardization) standards on EHR interoperability, personal health records, EHR requirements, and has contributed to several EHR security and confidentiality standards.

He has led multiple European projects in these areas, including Horizon 2020 and the IMI programme alongside pharma companies, hospitals and ICT companies. He recently co-led a €16m project on the re-use of EHR information for clinical research, EHR4CR, alongside ten global pharma. He is a partner in another IMI project, EMIF, on the development of a European clinical research platform federating multiple population health and cohort studies. Dipak also led an EU Network of Excellence on semantic interoperability, and is a partner in other EU projects on the sustainability of interoperability assets, the transatlantic sharing of patient summaries and quality labelling.

Dipak is President of the European Institute for Innovation through Health Data (www.i-HD.eu), which seeks to drive best practices in the trustworthy use of high quality and interoperable health data by all stakeholders, for optimising health and knowledge discovery. He is also President of the European Institute for Health Records (EuroRec), which is the coordinator or a partner in many EC projects on electronic health record quality and systems accreditation, interoperability and the uses of health data for research. EuroRec leads a network of national ProRec Centres which promote good quality EHR system adoption across Europe.

Dipak Kalra is Professor of Health Informatics at University College London and Visiting Professor of Health Informatics at Ghent University.

Dipak is a member of multiple standards bodies including BSI Group, CEN, ISO and HL7-UK (International HL7 Implementations).

Dipak was a founding Director of the openEHR Foundation, a not-for-profit company which exists to promote and publish, via the Web, the formal specification of requirements for electronic health record information, supporting development of open specifications for health information systems.

Dipak's innovations in EHR architectures have been spun out into a company: Helicon Health, providing cardiovascular chronic disease management services across London.

Positions held
 President, the EuroRec Institute
 President, the European Institute for Innovation through Health Data
 Professor of Health Informatics, Centre for Health Informatics and Multi-professional Education (CHIME), University College London, UK
 Visiting Professor, Ghent University, Belgium
 Honorary Senior Academic General Practitioner, The Whittington Hospital NHS Trust, London
 Director, the openEHR Foundation
 Consultant and advisor on semantic interoperability, to the European Commission, English National Health Service, Ministry of Health in Singapore and Ministry of Health in the Kingdom of Saudi Arabia.

Research projects
 EMIF – 2013-2018 €56m
This project, sponsored through the Innovative Medicines Initiative, comprises almost 50 academic partners and a dozen Pharma partners, developing a generic platform to provide harmonised views across multiple population health (cohort) data sets across Europe and geographically proximal EHR systems. The two initial clinical research areas are dementia and metabolic disorders. Dipak leads workpackages on semantic interoperability and ethics, and is a member of the business modeling task force.

 Electronic Health Records for Clinical Research (EHR4CR) – 2011-2016 €16m
This public-private research project, involving 35 partners from academia and 10 Pharma companies. EHR4CR is developing a platform to support remote querying of hospital electronic health records in order to enable more efficient feasibility assessment, recruitment and conduct of clinical trials. Dipak leads the Managing Entity and co-leads two work packages on requirements and on sustainable business models. The project is now spinning out a commercial platform for European scale-up to be run by Custodix, and a not-for-profit institute that Dipak will lead: the European Institute for Innovation through Health Data.

 VALUeHEALTH – 2015-2017  €1m
VALUeHEALTH is establishing how eHealth interoperability can create, deliver, and capture value for all stakeholders. It will develop an evidence-based business plan for self-funding priority pan-European eHealth Services beyond 2020. It will examine the maturity of existing standards and infrastructures, propose organisational changes and incentives, and perform state-of-the-art Cost Benefit Assessments, and from this produce a definitive Business Plan and Strategy for taking forward public-private investment in digital eHealth services. Dipak is the co-ordinator of VALUeHEALTH.

 eStandards – 2015-2017   €1m
eStandards brings together the leading Standard Developing Organizations in Europe, supported by the eHealth Network and EuroRec. It will develop an evidence-based roadmap for eHealth standards alignment that is endorsed by SDOs, the eHealth Network, and key stakeholders. It will contribute to the European eHealth Interoperability Framework, focusing on clinical content modelling for different paradigms and embedding a quality management system for interoperability testing and certification of eHealth systems. Dipak leads tasks on multi-stakeholder engagement and the development of good practice in clinical information modelling.

 ASSESS-CT – 2015-2016  €1m
ASSESS CT will contribute to better semantic interoperability of eHealth services in Europe, in order to optimise care and to minimise harm in delivery of care. The ASSESS CT project, integrating a broad range of stakeholders, will investigate the fitness of the international clinical terminology SNOMED CT as a potential standard for EU-wide eHealth deployments. It will investigate Member State reasons for adoption/non adoption of SNOMED CT, lessons learned, success factors and the impact of SNOMED CT adoption from a socio-economic viewpoint. Dipak leads the workpackage to define policy guidance and make the final recommendations of the project.

 SemanticHealthNet – 2012-2015  €3m
Semantic interoperability of EHR systems is a vital prerequisite for enabling patient-centred care and advanced clinical and biomedical research. SemanticHealthNet will develop a scalable and sustainable pan-European organisational and governance process to achieve this objective across healthcare systems and institutions. The consortium comprises 17 Partners and more than 40 internationally recognised experts, including from United States and Canada, ensuring a global impact. Dipak is the project lead.

 Trillium Bridge – 2013-2015 €270k
This project will design a development and adoption roadmap for sharing patient summaries between the US and the EU, with partners from both sides of the Atlantic. Trillium Bridge supports the Transatlantic eHealth/health IT Cooperation Memorandum of Understanding and Roadmap and the Digital Agenda for Europe in achieving a triple win for eHealth by establishing the foundations of an interoperability bridge to meaningfully exchange patient summaries and electronic health records among the EU and US.

 EXPAND – 2014-2015 €1m
EXPAND - Expanding Health Data Interoperability Services – is a Thematic Network (TN) EC project to progress towards an environment of sustainable cross border eHealth services established at EU level by the Connecting Europe Facility (CEF) and at national level through the deployment of suitable national infrastructures and services.

Partial bibliography 
 Daniel C, Sinaci A, Ouagne D, Sadou E, Declerck G, Kalra D, Charlet J, Forsberg K, Bain L, Mead C, et al., Standard-based EHR-enabled applications for clinical research and patient safety: CDISC - IHE QRPH - EHR4CR & SALUS collaboration, AMIA Joint Summits on Translational Science proceedings AMIA Summit on Translational Science, 2014, p. 19-25
 Moreno-Conde A, Moner D, Cruz WD, Santos MR, Maldonado JA, Robles M, Kalra D, Clinical information modeling processes for semantic interoperability of electronic health records: systematic review and inductive analysis, JAMIA, Mar 2015

 De Moor G, Sundgren M, Kalra D, Schmidt A, Dugas M, Claerhout B, Karakoyun T, Ohmann C, Lastic PY, Ammour N, et al., Using electronic health records for clinical research: The case of the EHR4CR project, J Biomed Inform, Feb 2015, vol.53 p. 162-173
 Elliot MJ, Kalra D, Singleton P and Smith D, Practical Privacy Controls when Re-using Medical Data for Research, Journal of Healthcare Information Management, 2014, vol.28(4), p. 50-57
 Kalra D, Artmann J, Stroetmann V, Boye N, The eHealth Contribution to Person-Centred Care, In Rosenmoller M, Whitehouse D, Wilson P. Managing EHealth: From Vision to Reality, Palgrave Macmillan, UK, .

 Dugas M, Breil B, Trinczek B, Stausberg J, Kalra D, Open metadata for medical data models. Studies in health technology and informatics, 2013 Jan 192:1257
 Rodrigues JM, Schulz S, Rector A, Spackman K, Ustün B, Chute C, Della Mea V, Millar J, Brand Persson K, Kalra D, Do we need a Common Ontology between ICD 11 and SNOMED CT to ensure Seamless Re-Use and Semantic Interoperability?, Studies in health technology and informatics, 2013 Jan 192:1234

 Tapuria A, Austin T, Sun S, Lea N, Iliffe S, Kalra D, Ingram D, Patterson D, Clinical advantages of decision support tool for anticoagulation control, IEEE Point-Of-Care Healthcare Technologies (PHT), 2013, p. 331-334

 Kalra D, Schmidt A, Potts HWW, Dupont D, Sundgren M, De Moor G, on behalf of the EHR4CR Research consortium, Case Report from the EHR4CR Project: A European Survey on Electronic Health Records Systems for Clinical Research, iHealth Connections, 2011; 1(2)p. 108-113.
 Kalra D, Musen M, Smith B, Ceusters W, De Moor G, ARGOS Policy Brief on Semantic Interoperability, Stud Health Technol Inform, 2011, 170, p. 1-15

 Kalra D, Health informatics 3.0, Yearbook Med Inform, 2011, 6(1), p. 8-14

ISO International standards (development led by Dipak)
 Kalra D, Datta G, 2011, ISO TR 14292 Personal Health Records - Definition, scope and context
 Kalra D, Sawatsky E, 2011, ISO TS 14265 Classification of purposes for processing personal health information
 Kalra D, 2010, ISO 18308 Requirements for an Electronic Health Record Reference Architecture
 Kalra D, 2010, ISO/EN 13606 Electronic Health Record Communication Part 5: Interface Specification
 Kalra D, 2009, ISO 13606 Electronic Health Record Communication Part 3: Reference Archetypes and Term Lists
 Kalra D, 2009, ISO TS 13606 Electronic Health Record Communication Part 4: Security
 Kalra D, Beale T, Lloyd D, Heard S, 2008, ISO 13606 Electronic Health Record Communication Part 2: Archetype Interchange Specification
 Kalra D, Lloyd D., 2008, ISO 13606 Electronic Health Record Communication Part 1: Reference Model

References

===Sources===
 The EuroRec Institute
 CHIME - Centre for Health Informatics and Multi-professional Education
 EMIF EC-Project
 EHR4CR EC-Project
 ASSESS CT EC-Project
 SemanticHealthNet EC-Project
 Trillium Bridge EC-Project
 Expand EC-Project
 VALUeHEALTH EC-project
 eStandards EC-Project

20th-century British medical doctors
English people of South Asian descent
Health informaticians
Academic staff of Ghent University
Living people
1959 births
Medical doctors from London
British general practitioners